Mount Lemmon Air Force Station (ADC ID: M-92, NORAD ID: Z-92) is a closed United States Air Force General Surveillance Radar station. It was closed in 1969.

History
Mount Lemmon Air Force Station was established in 1954 by Air Defense Command as one of a planned deployment of forty-four mobile radar stations to support the permanent ADC Radar network in the United States sited around the perimeter of the country. This deployment was projected to be operational by mid-1952. Funding, constant site changes, construction, and equipment delivery delayed deployment.

This site became operational on 1 April 1956 when the 684th Aircraft Control and Warning Squadron was assigned by the 34th Air Division to Mount Lemmon AFS.  The squadron began operations using AN/MPS-7, AN/MPS-14, and AN/TPS-10D radars at Mount Lemmon in August 1956, and initially the station functioned as an aircraft control and warning station.  The AN/TPS-l0D was soon retired. By 1959 an AN/FPS-20 had replaced the AN/MPS-7 search radar.

The Coordinate Data Transmitting Set (CDTS) (AN/FST-2) at the main site converted each radar return into a digital word which was transmitted by the GATR via microwave to the Control Center.

During 1961 Mount Lemmon AFS joined the Semi Automatic Ground Environment (SAGE) system, feeding data to DC-21 at  Luke AFB, Arizona.  After joining, the squadron was re-designated as the 684th Radar Squadron (SAGE) on 15 October 1961.  The radar squadron provided information 24/7 the SAGE Direction Center where it was analyzed to determine range, direction altitude speed and whether or not aircraft were friendly or hostile.  During the following year, an AN/FPS-6 supplemented the AN/MPS-14 height-finder radar, and the AN/FPS-20 was upgraded to become an AN/FPS-67.  On 31 July 1963, the site was redesignated as NORAD ID Z-92.  The AN/FPS-6 was removed in 1968.

In addition to the main facility, Mount Lemmon operated several AN/FPS-14 Gap Filler sites:
 Sells, AZ     (M-92A): 
 Benson, AZ    (M-92C): 
 Globe, AZ     (M-92D): 

The 684th was inactivated in December 1969. However, the GATR facility (R-92) was later reactivated, and is still in use as site G-29 by the 355th Communications Squadron, Davis-Monthan AFB, Arizona.  After its closure, Mount Lemmon AFS was used by the University of Arizona and others as an observatory.  Its  tracking radar (now removed) was used by US Army from Fort Huachuca.

Air Force units and assignments

Units
 '684th Aircraft Control and Radar Squadron (Assigned on 1 April 1956)
 Activated at Geiger Field, Washington on 1 December 1953
 Moved to Kirtland AFB, New Mexico on 1 January 1954
 Moved to Davis Monthan AFB, Arizona on 1 April 1954
 Redesignated 684th Radar Squadron (SAGE), 15 October 1961
 Inactivated on 31 December 1969

Assignments
 34th Air Division, 1 April 1956
 Los Angeles Air Defense Sector, 1 January 1960
 Phoenix Air Defense Sector, 1 May 1961
 27th Air Division, 1 April 1966-31 December 1969

See also
 List of USAF Aerospace Defense Command General Surveillance Radar Stations

References

  Cornett, Lloyd H. and Johnson, Mildred W., A Handbook of Aerospace Defense Organization  1946 - 1980,  Office of History, Aerospace Defense Center, Peterson AFB, CO (1980).
 Winkler, David F. & Webster, Julie L., Searching the Skies, The Legacy of the United States Cold War Defense Radar Program,  US Army Construction Engineering Research Laboratories, Champaign, IL (1997).
 Information for Mount Lemmon AFS, AZ

Installations of the United States Air Force in Arizona
Semi-Automatic Ground Environment sites
Aerospace Defense Command military installations
1956 establishments in Arizona
1969 disestablishments in Arizona
Military installations established in 1956
Military installations closed in 1969